Erewhon Market is an upscale California supermarket chain with eight locations, all in Los Angeles County. Erewhon focuses on niche, locally produced, organic foods and offering foods appealing to raw, vegan, keto, kosher, and other alternative diets. It is known for offering products that are often exclusively sold at Erewhon.

History
Erewhon was founded in Boston in 1966 by Michio and Aveline Kushi. The name "Erewhon" is derived from the 1872 satirical novel  Erewhon  by Samuel Butler. In the novel, Erewhon (an anagram of "nowhere") is a utopia in which individuals are responsible for their own health. Still a small chain with just eight stores, the brand has been compared to the early years of Whole Foods Market. The Erewhon Organic brand was originally a health foods producer with just a single store. In 2011, Tony Antoci bought the company after initially looking into being a Dean & DeLuca franchisee; he currently serves as CEO. Following several years of increasing financial performance, New York–based private equity firm Stripes Group purchased a substantial minority stake in Erewhon in 2019. In April 2021, Erewhon announced plans to open their first Beverly Hills location in the former Williams-Sonoma space, which is Erewhon's eighth store. The Beverly Hills store opened in August 2022. In 2023, Erewhon ships nationwide to all 50 states.

Locations

Calabasas
Fairfax District
Pacific Palisades
Santa Monica
Silver Lake
Venice
Studio City
Beverly Hills
Culver City (expected to open in 2022)
Pasadena (expected to open in 2023)

In popular culture

Season 25 episode 4 of South Park references Erewhon as part of a running joke.

Erewhon is referenced in the Wallice song "Off the Rails."

Erewhon is referenced by guest star Corbin Bleu in the fourth episode of season three of High School Musical: The Musical: The Series.

See also
Bristol Farms
Gelson's
Trader Joe's

References

External links
 Official Website
 Nationwide Shipping Website

Retail companies established in 1980
Supermarkets based in California
Companies based in Los Angeles County, California
Companies based in Los Angeles
Health food stores
Privately held companies based in California
Venice, Los Angeles
Santa Monica, California
Silver Lake, Los Angeles
Pacific Palisades, Los Angeles
Calabasas, California
Upper class culture in the United States